Aliabad-e Khvoshablu (also Romanized as ‘Alīābād-e Khvoshāblū) is a village in Siyakh Darengun Rural District, in the Central District of Shiraz County, Fars Province, Iran. At the 2006 census, its population was 21, in 5 families.

References 

Populated places in Shiraz County